Samuel and Elbert Jackson House is a historic home located at Wantagh in Nassau County, New York. It is an essentially L-shaped dwelling.  It is a -story wood-frame structure with rear and side wings, one of which dates to the 18th century.  The large main, square central block dates from the mid-19th century and is two stories with a simple, straight pitched gable roof.  There are Greek Revival details.

It was listed on the National Register of Historic Places in 2006.

References

Houses on the National Register of Historic Places in New York (state)
Greek Revival houses in New York (state)
Houses in Nassau County, New York
National Register of Historic Places in Nassau County, New York